Evangelista Andreoli (27 June 1810 – 16 June 1875) was an Italian organist, pianist, and teacher.

He was crippled in both legs, but was able to play the pedal keyboard of the organ through a special device that he constructed.

He was the father of a musical family, including the notable sons Guglielmo the Elder (1835-1860), Carlo (1840-1908), and Guglielmo the Younger (1862-1932). He also had another son with the name Evangelista (1845-1867), who was also a pianist and teacher.

References
 
 

1810 births
1875 deaths
Italian organists
Male organists
Italian classical pianists
Italian male pianists
Italian music educators
People from Mirandola
19th-century Italian musicians
19th-century classical pianists
19th-century organists
19th-century Italian male musicians